Charles R. Baquet III (born December 24, 1941 in New Orleans, Louisiana) was an American Career Foreign Service Officer who served as Ambassador Extraordinary and Plenipotentiary to Djibouti from 1991 until 1993. He served as the Deputy Director of the U.S. Peace Corps in South Africa.

Biography
Baquet attended public schools in New Orleans and earned a B.A. in history from Xavier University in New Orleans in 1963. In 1975, he earned his M.A. in public administration from the Maxwell School of Government at Syracuse University.

References

Xavier University of Louisiana alumni
Maxwell School of Citizenship and Public Affairs alumni
Ambassadors of the United States to Djibouti
1941 births
People from New Orleans
Living people
20th-century American diplomats